Baiju may refer to:

 Nanjing baiju, a Chinese folk art form from Nanjing involving singing and storytelling 
 Baiju, Jiangsu, a town in Yancheng, Jiangsu, China

People with the given name
 Baiju Noyan ( 13th-century), a Mongol commander and noyan in Persia, Anatolia and Georgia
 Baiju Bawra ("Baiju the Insane", 1542–1613), Indian dhrupad singer
 Baiju Parthan (born 1956), Indian painter
 Baiju Dharmajan (born 1968), Indian guitarist
 Baiju Santhosh (born 1970), Indian film actor in Malayalam films
 Baiju Bhatt (born 1984/1985), American billionaire, co-founder of Robinhood

See also
 Baijiu, Chinese distilled alcoholic beverage